Sondra Currie is an American actress. Currie is married to television and film director Alan J. Levi. As a couple, Currie and Levi co-produced the short film Take My Hand. The film was directed by Levi and written by actress Eileen Grubba. Currie starred alongside Grubba and Barbara Bain.

Currie is a lifetime member of the Actors Studio in West Hollywood, California. At the Actors Studio, Currie has trained under Martin Landau, Mark Rydell, Lou Antonio and Salome Jens. She also studied under Milton Katselas as a member of his Master Class for 17 years.

Sondra Currie remains active in the Los Angeles television, film and theatre scene as an actress, producer and arts-advocate. Currie's most recent film credits include producer-director Todd Phillips' The Hangover trilogy. Recent television credits include a recurring role in producer Tyler Perry's comedy series Love Thy Neighbor. Favorite stage credits include The Vagina Monologues, Death of a Salesman and After The Fall.

Currie was a founding member of Camelot Artists – now the Katselas Theatre Company – and is a member of the prestigious Theatre West. Currie served on the Board of the California Independent Film Festival and was a Jury Member for ten years. In 2008, Currie was invited to be a Juror at the first International Indie Film Festival in Sapporo, Japan, where Sondra was the sole woman on the panel.

Currie's sisters, identical twins Cherie and Marie Currie, are singers and also actresses. Cherie was, and is best known for being, the Runaways' frontwoman.

Selected filmography

Movies

Television

References

External links
 
 Official Website

Living people
Actresses from Los Angeles
American film actresses
American television actresses
20th-century American actresses
21st-century American actresses
Year of birth missing (living people)